Mayhem Festival 2008 was the first iteration of the annual concert festival created by Kevin Lyman.

Mayhem Festival 2008 tour information
The Mayhem Festival, like most large festivals of a similar caliber, feature bands that recently released or are just about to release a new album. All of the main stage headliners will be promoting their new albums on this tour, as well as some of the second and third stage bands like 36 Crazyfists, Black Tide and Underoath.

The festival also offers some other activities such as playing the newest video games, perusing vendors, attending autograph signing sessions.

Rockstar Energy Drinks will be sampling their products. Additional sponsors include Jägermeister, Hot Topic and DiNGLIFE.com (Device Personalization Company). FUSE Television and Revolver Magazine (who will produce the Official Tour Program) have signed on as official Rockstar Energy Mayhem Festival media partners. Live Nation is set to promote the festival nationally.

Also joining the tour is the Metal mulisha freestyle motocross team. In the press release regarding the tour, a founding member of the Metal Mulisha and freestyle rider named Brian Deegan was quoted saying "They’ll be mixing the sound of riffing and ripping 250CC motorcycles flying 150 feet in the air against the backdrop of double bass drums and shredding guitars."

Sevendust pulls out of tour
Sevendust originally planned on participating in the festival, but pulled out of the festival according to Blabbermouth.net. The band was replaced by Underoath.

Slipknot injuries
During the opening date of the festival on July 9, Sid Wilson the turntablist of Slipknot broke both of his heels when he jumped from an elevated area of the stage and landed incorrectly. Despite the injury, he promised to perform on all dates of the tour even in a wheelchair. With both his legs in casts he returned with the band on the second date of the festival on July 12 in a wheelchair, he has however performed without it (he was seen on August 10 with the chair on stage and included it into the act).  Throughout the tour, he has been seen to repeatedly slip out of the wheelchair in order to crawl across the stage and climb upon the set pieces and drum set. His 'Moon Boots' as Corey Taylor calls them, are displayed to the audience at some point during the set.

During the tour Slipknot drummer Joey Jordison also suffered an injury by breaking his ankle. Slipknot finished the tour regardless but were forced to cancel several appearances at European festivals due to the injury.

Mayhem Festival 2008 lineup

Main stage
Slipknot
Disturbed
DragonForce
Mastodon

Jägermeister Stage
Machine Head 
Airbourne 
Five Finger Death Punch
Walls of Jericho
Jägermeister Opening Band (See Below)

Hot Topic Stage
Underoath
Black Tide
Suicide Silence
36 Crazyfists
The Red Chord

Tour dates

References

Mayhem Festival by year
2008 concert tours
2008 music festivals
2008 festivals in the United States
July 2008 events in the United States
August 2008 events in the United States